Konice is a town in Prostějov District in the Olomouc Region of the Czech Republic. It has about 2,700 inhabitants.

Administrative parts
Villages of Čunín, Křemenec, Ladín, Nová Dědina and Runářov are administrative parts of Konice. Nová Dědina forms an exclave of the municipal territory.

Geography
It lies on the border between the Drahany Highlands and Zábřeh Highlands. The Romže River flows through the town.

History
The first written mention of Konice is from 1200. It was probably the site of a fortress, which protected a trade route from Moravia to Bohemia. After the settlement was founded, the fortress became a manor house.

After Konice changed hands several times, it became a property of the Lords of Švábenice, who held it from 1434 to 1655. After several property disputes, it was bought by the Hradisko Monastery in 1699. The monastery was abolished in 1784 and its propertives were managed by the state. Konice was bought by the entrepreneur Karel Příza in 1825. He reconstructed the local castle and moved there in 1830. His family owned the estate until 1945.

In 1970, Konice obtained the status of a town.

Demographics

Economy
The largest employer is the textile company Moděva Konice. It was founded in 1931 and resides in Konice since 1949.

Transport
Konice lies on the railway line of local importance leading from Prostějov to Dzbel.

Sights
The most important monument is the Konice Castle. This Baroque castle replaced the old fortress in 1705.

The parish Church of the Nativity of the Virgin Mary was first indirectly mentioned in 1371. It was and rebuilt into its current form in 1699–1709. It houses a unique wooden pulpit.

Notable people
Jaroslav Krejčí (1892–1956), lawyer and Nazi collaborator
Pavel Trávníček (born 1950), actor
Jan Březina (born 1954), politician
Miloslav Vlček (born 1961), politician

In popular culture
The town appeared in the Czech film Dark Blue World.

References

External links

Cities and towns in the Czech Republic
Populated places in Prostějov District